Miss Earth 2019, the 19th edition of the Miss Earth pageant, was held on October 26, 2019, at Okada Manila in Parañaque, Metro Manila, Philippines where Nguyễn Phương Khánh of Vietnam was succeeded by Nellys Pimentel of Puerto Rico at the end of the event. This marks the first time Puerto Rico has won Miss Earth, becoming the first territory to win at least once in all of the Big Four international beauty pageants.

In the same event, other elemental winners were also crowned: Emanii Davis of the United States won Miss Earth – Air, Klára Vavrušková of the Czech Republic as Miss Earth – Water, and Alisa Manyonok of Belarus as Miss Earth – Fire.

Results

 Miss Earth
 Miss Earth – Air
 Miss Earth – Water
 Miss Earth – Fire
 Top 10
 Top 20

Placements

Note: Placed in the Top 20 are two spots chosen by the People and Judges for the Best Eco-Video (‡) and Best Eco-Social Media (§) Awardees

Pre-pageant activities

Medal Tally
To sort this table by delegate, total medal count, or any other column, click on the  icon next to the column title.

Medalists

Other Awards

Judges 
The judges for the pageant coronation night and live telecast include:
 Dr. Jikyeong Kang - President and Dean, Asian Institute of Management, MVP Chair of Marketing
 Cecile Guidote-Alvarez - Founder, Philippine Educational Theater Association (PETA)
 Leo Valdez - Renowned Filipino theater actor
 Lorraine Schuck - Executive Vice President, Carousel Productions
 Ernie Lopez - Environmentalist, travel blogger, current host of ABS-CBN's G Diaries
 Lorife Magadan-Otaza - Environmental activist, incumbent Mayor of Loreto, Agusan del Sur
 Shontelle - Grammy Award-nominated singer

Contestants
85 delegates competed for the title.

References

External links

2019
2019 beauty pageants
Beauty pageants in the Philippines
2019 in the Philippines